Atlantic Aircraft Corporation, also known as Fokker-America and Atlantic-Fokker, was a US subsidiary of the Dutch Fokker company, responsible for sales and information about Fokker imports, and eventually constructing various Fokker designs.

History
In 1920 Anthony Fokker had established the Netherlands Aircraft Manufacturing Company of Amsterdam as his American sales office. The company's representatives were Robert B.C. Noorduyn and Frits Cremer, a friend and test pilot for Anthony Fokker since before World War I. They successfully sold aircraft imported from Europe in the United States. But Fokker's typical construction of wooden wings and a steel-tube fuselage, both covered with fabric, also attracted the attention of the US Army. This resulted in an order to equip their De Havilland DH.4s with steel fuselages. The only restriction was that these had to be manufactured in the United States, therefore Fokker purchased the Wittemann-Lewis factory in 1923 and founded the Atlantic Aircraft Corporation in May 1924. The company was based in Hasbrouck Heights, New Jersey, and Teterboro, New Jersey. Lorillard Spencer became the president and Robert B.C. Noorduyn, the General Manager.

The Netherlands Aircraft Manufacturing Company was succeeded by the Fokker Aircraft Corporation, which held the license rights of the Fokker designs and remained responsible for selling the aircraft from the Dutch Fokker factory. In September 1925 the Fokker Aircraft Corporation took over the stocks and orders of the Atlantic Aircraft Corporation, which since then had become a full subsidiary of it. In 1925 the company also began to manufacture one of Noorduyn's own designs, the Fokker Universal.

In 1927 the Fokker Aircraft Corporation of America was founded, which took over the Fokker Aircraft Corporation. A factory at Passaic, New Jersey, was added in 1927, and another at Glen Dale, West Virginia, in August 1928. Although the company had changed its name, many of its products continued to be referred to as "Atlantic" or "Atlantic Fokker" for some years.

Fokker Aircraft Company of America became a subsidiary of General Motors which acquired a 40 percent holding in May 1929, but ended operations the following year as a combination of the effect of the Great Depression and bad publicity surrounding the 1931 crash of a Transcontinental & Western Air Fokker F-10 that killed celebrated football coach Knute Rockne. Fokker ended his association with the American company in 1931. General Motors renamed their aviation subsidiary General Aviation Manufacturing Corporation, which in turn became part of North American Aviation in 1934.

Aircraft

References

External links
 aerofiles.com

Defunct aircraft manufacturers of the United States
Fokker
Defunct companies based in New Jersey
Manufacturing companies based in New Jersey
Manufacturing companies established in 1924
Manufacturing companies disestablished in 1931
Former General Motors subsidiaries
1924 establishments in New Jersey
1931 disestablishments in New Jersey
American subsidiaries of foreign companies